Francisco Ruiz may refer to:
Francisco María Ruiz (1754–1839), early settler of San Diego, California
Francisco Antonio Ruiz (c. 1804–1876), responsible for identifying the bodies of those killed at the Battle of the Alamo
José Francisco Ruiz (1783–1840), Texas revolutionary and politician
Francisco Ruiz-Tagle (c. 1790–1860), Chilean president
Francisco Ruiz Lozano (1607–1677), Peruvian soldier, astronomer, mathematician and educator
José Francisco Ruiz Massieu (1946–1994), Mexican politician
Francisco Ruiz (volleyball) (born 1991), Spanish volleyball player
Francisco Ruiz (bishop) (1476–1528), Spanish Roman Catholic bishop
Francisco Olvera Ruiz (born 1956), Mexican IRP politician